Barnabé Brisson (11 October 1777 – 25 September 1828) was a French engineer and mathematician. He collaborated in the construction of the Canal de Saint-Quentin and other navigable waterways connected to the Escaut River. He also authored a number of academic publications on the canal systems.

Notes
MacTutor History of Mathematics archive: Biography of Barnabé Brisson

Engineers from Lyon
19th-century French engineers
19th-century French mathematicians
Corps des ponts
École Polytechnique alumni
1777 births
1828 deaths